The Tears of Saint Peter or Penitent Saint Peter is a c.1587-1596 painting by El Greco. It is similar to other works on the same subject by the artist, such as those in the Bowes Museum, the El Greco Museum, the national museum in Stockholm and others.

This version seems to have belonged to the marqués de Legarda, who kept it in Vitoria. Electra Havemeyer acquired it in 1909 and then in 1930 by the Florida-based Cuban collector Oscar B. Cintas, who restored it. Finally it was bought in 1998 by the Museo Soumaya, where it still hangs.

References

Bibliography
 ÁLVAREZ LOPERA, José, El Greco, Madrid, Arlanza, 2005, Biblioteca «Descubrir el Arte», (colección «Grandes maestros»). .
 SCHOLZ-HÄNSEL, Michael, El Greco, Colonia, Taschen, 2003. .

1580s paintings
1590s paintings
Paintings by El Greco
Paintings in the collection of the Museo Soumaya
El Greco